is a passenger railway station in the city of Shiraoka, Saitama, Japan, operated by East Japan Railway Company (JR East).

Lines

Station layout
This station has an elevated station building with one ground-level island platform and one ground-level side platform underneath, serving three tracks. The station is staffed.

Platforms

History
Shiraoka Station opened on 11 February 1910. With the privatization of JNR on 1 April 1987, the station came under the control of JR East.

Passenger statistics
In fiscal 2019, the station was used by an average of 12,854 passengers daily (boarding passengers only).

Surrounding area
 Shiraoka Central General Hospital 
 Kogukihisaizu Shrine 
 Shiraoka City Central Community Center

See also
 List of railway stations in Japan

References

External links

  JR East station information 

Railway stations in Saitama Prefecture
Railway stations in Japan opened in 1910
Tōhoku Main Line
Utsunomiya Line
Shiraoka, Saitama